La Rose, la violette et le papillon (The Rose, the Violet, and the Butterfly) is a ballet divertissement in one act, with choreography by Marius Petipa, and music by Duke Peter Georgievich of Oldenburg. The libretto was by Jules Perrot.

The Principal Dancers were Mariia Surovshchikova-Petipa (the Rose), Matilda Madaeva (the Violet), and Marfa Muravieva (as the Butterfly).

Plot outline 

A rose and a violet have both become enamoured by a gorgeous butterfly who flutters around them, paying court to their sweet embrace. The blossoms attempt to succeed the other with their floral charms, however at the end of these proceedings, the butterfly chooses to fly away rather than exclude one over the other.

Trivia
When this ballet was given its second premiere at the St. Petersburg Imperial Bolshoi Kamenny Theatre October 20/November 1, 1857, the choreography was incorrectly credited to the Balletmaster Jules Perrot in the theatre program.
Music from this ballet was interpolated into Petipa and Perrot's 1858 revival of Le Corsaire, in which it was titled the Pas d'Esclave. The piece has remained a part of the performance tradition of Le Corsaire to the present day.

Ballets by Marius Petipa
Ballets by Jules Perrot
Ballets by Prince Oldenburg
1857 ballet premieres
Ballets premiered in Saint Petersburg